The Cheboygan Opera House is a modern building and 582-seat Victorian theater space located in Cheboygan, Michigan.
The Opera House is a multiple-use building and contains the town's city hall, police headquarters, and fire station, as well as the theater. The Opera House is located in downtown Cheboygan west of the Cheboygan River.  Its address is 403 North Huron Street.

History
The theater was originally constructed in 1877, but was rebuilt after fire damage in 1888, and the current theater layout is considered authentic to that date.  The theater was further rebuilt in 1903 after another fire.  After serving the people of Cheboygan for many decades, the Opera House went dark in the 1960s.  It was refurbished and reopened in 1984.

References

Theatres in Michigan
Buildings and structures in Cheboygan County, Michigan
1877 establishments in Michigan
Theatres completed in 1877